Idaho Comics Group (ICG) is an independent comic book publishing company from Boise, Idaho that was founded in 2014, which publishes the officially licensed Tarzan and the Comics of Idaho anthology and Idaho Comics.  The anthologies benefit the Boise Public Library and to bring attention to comic book writers and artists from the state of Idaho.

History 

On September 12, 2014, Idaho Comics Group was featured in a Comic Book Resources article.

On September 16, 2014, Idaho Comics Group was featured in an article on the official Edgar Rice Burroughs website.

On December 1, 2014, Idaho Comics Group was featured in an article by Idaho Magazine.

On December 9, 2014, Idaho Comics Group was mentioned again in a Comic Book Resources article.

January 12, 2015, Idaho Comics Group was featured in an article in The Idaho Librarian.

On March 25, 2015, Randall Kirby, who contributed stories to Tarzan and the Comics of Idaho #1-3, was featured in a story by The Huffington Post and his three page story from Tarzan and the Comics of Idaho #1 was featured in the article.

On September 1, 2015, Tarzan and the Comics of Idaho #1 was reviewed on the Handsome Boys Comics Hour podcast.

On October 6, 2015, The Best American Comics 2015 was released, and Idaho Comics Group contributors Dennis P. Eichhorn's Extra Good Stuff and Dame Darcy's Voyage of the Temptress were named to the list of "Notable Comics" published from September 1, 2013, to August 31, 2014 by series editor Bill Kartalopoulos.  Dennis Eichhorn contributed to Tarzan and the Comics of Idaho #1-3 as well as Idaho Comics #1 and #2.  Dame Darcy contributed to Tarzan and the Comics of Idaho #1.  In fact, Dame Darcy's Voyage of the Temptress made its print debut in Tarzan and the Comics of Idaho #1.

On October 13, 2015, ICG publisher Albert Asker remembers his late friend Dennis Eichhorn in a video produced by The Idaho Statesman.

On August 27, 2015, Idaho Comics Group comic books were featured in a library exhibition at Boise State University.

On August 29, 2015, it was announced that a talk on the History of Comic Books in Idaho would be given at Boise State University by ICG publisher Albert Asker.

On July 8, 2016, Idaho Comics Group was mentioned in a Comics Alliance article on the history of Tarzan comic books.

On October 4, 2016, The Best American Comics 2016 was released and series editor Bill Kartalopoulos listed Dennis Eichhorn's Extra Good Stuff as one of the "Notable Comics printed between September 1, 2014 to August 31, 2015."  The Best American Comics 2016 debuted at the #1 spot on The New York Times Best Sellers List when it was released.

Titles

Tarzan and the Comics of Idaho (2014–present)

Issue #1 (2014) 

Features work from the following writers and artists:

 Charles Soule (Superman/Wonder Woman, The Death of Wolverine, She-Hulk, Swamp Thing)
 Dennis Eichhorn (Real Stuff, Weirdo, Will Eisner's The Spirit: The New Adventures)
 Todd Clark (the nationally syndicated Lola comic strip)
 Steve Moore (the nationally syndicated In The Bleachers comic strip)
 Dame Darcy (Meat Cake)
 Allen Gladfelter (Disney's/Pixar's CARS, Occupy Comics)
 Steve Willhite (FUBAR, Jesus Hates Zombies)
 Scott Pentzer (Rose & Gunn, Sade, Rock 'n' Roll Comics)
 Randall Kirby (BOP! Comics)
 Jim Sumii (Tura and Eva)
 Julia Green (Mystic Pets)
 Adam Rosenlund (Light Years Away) COVER ARTIST
 Jon Keithley (Shivertown, 6x6)
 Shanae LaVelle (Shivertown, 6x6)
 Gaz Asker (Idaho Comics)
 Albert Frank Asker (Idaho Comics, 6x6)

NOTE: Charles Soule is not actually from Idaho.  He wrote a story illustrated by Boisean Allen Gladfelter.  All other creators are from Idaho.

Issue #2 (2015) 

Features work from the following writers and artists:

 Monte Michael Moore (painted covers for DC Comics and Marvel Comics) COVER ARTIST
 Bill Schelly (Alter Ego (magazine), The Eye, Fandom's Finest Comics)
 Dennis Eichhorn (Real Good Stuff, Extra Good Stuff)
 Todd Clark (the nationally syndicated Lola comic strip)
 Randall Kirby (BOP! Comics, Anything That Loves)
 Scott Pentzer (Sports Superstars, Rock 'N' Roll Comics, Rose & Gunn, Sade)
 Adrianne Presnell (6x6)
 Steve Willhite (FUBAR, Jesus Hates Zombies, Mother Russia)
 Peter Lawson (Border Town Comic Con)
 Dick Trageser (Fandom's Finest Comics)
 John Barrie (TATCOI #2)
 Michelle Estrada (TATCOI #2)
 Jay O'Leary (Push)
 Bob Beason (Captain Bengal)
 Geoffery C. Everts (Disney cartoons animator, Jethro's Rad Euro-Zine 2.0)
 Jake Scholl (Blade of the Broken)
 Bethany Schultz Hurst (award-winning poet of Miss Lost Nation)
 Gaz Asker (Tarzan and the Comics of Idaho #1, Idaho Comics #1)
 Albert Frank Asker (Tarzan and the Comics of Idaho #1, Idaho Comics #1, 6x6)

Issue #3 (2016) 

Features work from the following writers and artists:

 Ward P. Hooper (Mayor's Art Award, 2005; Best Idaho Visual Artist 2007 and 2012) COVER ARTIST
 James Lloyd (Art Director of the Treefort Music Fest, Mystic Pets, Cowboy Comics)
 Dennis Eichhorn (Real Stuff, Real Good Stuff, Extra Good Stuff, The Adventures of Ace International)
 Jacob Bear (Hawk and Dove, Batbear, Deadpooh)
 Randall Kirby (BOP Comics)
 Joseph Bradshaw (Kingdom Of Freedom)
 Treycen Fluckiger (Why Not?)
 James Lichtenberg (Why Not?)
 Hector Diaz (Art Director for Nampa's Dia En Downtown)
 Scott Pentzer (Sports Superstars, Rock 'N' Roll Comics, Rose & Gunn, Sade)
 Damon Bradshaw (Push)
 Gaz Asker (Art Director, Idaho Comics Group)
 Albert Frank Asker (Editor-In-Chief, Idaho Comics Group)

NOTE: Tarzan and the Comics of Idaho #3 features a few kind words from Pulitzer Prize-winning author Anthony Doerr.

Idaho Comics  (2014–present)

Issue #1 (2014) 

Idaho Comics is a companion piece to Tarzan and the Comics of Idaho.  Each issue features an article on the history of comic books in Idaho that expands the breadth and depth on some of the subjects touched on in the creator's introductions in Tarzan and the Comics of Idaho.  Idaho Comics also looks to bring attention to famous autobiographical comic book writer Dennis P. Eichhorn by featuring his work and highlighting his contributions to Idaho sequential art through the articles on the history of comic books in Idaho.

 Features an article on the history of comic books in Idaho with a special emphasis on Edgar Rice Burroughs and his time in Idaho working as a cowboy/adventurer, ranch hand, photography and stationery store owner, gold prosecutor, and city councilman in Parma, Idaho.
 Features an autobiographical story by Dennis Eichhorn about the time Lyle Smith recruited him to play football at Boise Junior College (now Boise State University)
 Features comic strips by Idaho Comics Group editor for art direction, Gaz Asker
 Features two stories that Albert Frank Asker submitted to Piranha Press when he was thirteen years old.

Idaho Comics #1 features work by:
Dennis Eichhorn
Albert Frank Asker COVER ARTIST
Gaz Asker COVER ARTIST

Issue #2 (2015)

 Features a brand new autobiographical story by Dennis Eichhorn about the time he was investigated by the Salt Lake City Police Department over a comic book he published in Moscow, Idaho in 1974
 Features two other autobiographical stories by Dennis P. Eichhorn
 Features a continuation on the article on the history of comic books in Idaho again with special emphasis on Edgar Rice Burroughs and the comic books published in Idaho based on his characters

Idaho Comics #2 Features work by:
 Dennis Eichhorn
 Albert Frank Asker
 Jim Sumii
 Gaz Asker
 Damon Bradshaw COVER ARTIST
 Scott Fife
 Reilly Clark
 Jim Loney
 Mark Zingarelli
 Seth Tobocman

Podcast: Idaho Comics with Albert Asker 
The "Idaho Comics with Albert Asker" podcasts serve as a compendium piece to the Idaho Comics Group comic books, adding depth and breadth to the subjects touched on in the "History of Comic Books in Idaho" articles.  Each month Albert Asker interviews a person with ties to comic books in Idaho. Episodes of "Idaho Comics with Albert Asker" can be found on iTunes, SoundCloud, and Stitcher.  There is another podcast upcoming from this group called The Idaho Comics Group Sports Report and Podcast,

Episode One (October 2016): "Idaho Comics News" (Pilot) 
Episode Two (November 2016): Randall Kirby 
Episode Three (December 2016): Steve Willhite 
Episode Four (January 2017): Josh Shapel 
Episode Five (February 2017): Catherine Kyle 
Episode Six (March 2017): Adam Rosenlund 
Episode Seven (April 2017): Jacob Bear and Dan Feldmeier 
Episode Eight (May 2017): Terry Blas 
Episode Nine (June 2017): Shanae Lavelle 
Episode Ten (July 2017): Scott Pentzer 
Episode Eleven (August 2017): Ethan Ede 
Episode Twelve (September 2017):  Erica Crockett 
Episode Thirteen (April 2018):  Brian Douglas Ahern and Randall Kirby 
Episode Fourteen (June 2018):  Julia Green 
Episode Fifteen (July 2018): James W.A.R. Lloyd 
Episode Sixteen (July 2018):  BONUS! Wizard World Comic Con Boise 2018 Review
Episode Seventeen (August 2018):  The Dennis Eichhorn Project Part I
Episode Eighteen (September 2018):  The Dennis Eichhorn Project Part II
Episode Nineteen (December 2018): CF Arik Grant 
Episode Twenty (April 2019):  Ron Randall

References

External links
 Idaho Comics Group - Tumblr site
 Idaho Comics Group - Facebook site
 Mystery House Radio - SoundCloud site

Comic book publishing companies of the United States
Companies based in Boise, Idaho